Matsuno Chikanobu (fl. 1720s) was a Japanese painter of the Kaigetsudō school of ukiyo-e art.

He is believed to have worked closely with Baiōken Eishun, another Kaigetsudō artist whose style shows significant similarities.

References
Lane, Richard (1978). Images of the Floating World. Old Saybrook, CT: Konecky & Konecky.

18th-century Japanese artists
Year of birth unknown
Year of death unknown
Chikanobu